Jeinny Rodriguez (born 13 January 1988) is a Venezuelan actress, television hostess, and model who frequently appears in U.S. Spanish-language TV novelas and other programs on the Telemundo, Fox Deportes and Univision networks.

Early life
Lizarazo was born in Caracas, Venezuela.  She began acting and dancing as a child, making her musical debut in school at age 7 playing the role of the Virgin Mary.

Career
Lizarazo was discovered in Miami Beach by a TV producer who invited her to participate in a contest on the popular Telemundo network program Descontrol.  She won and was chosen to be a co-host of the weekly dance music show.

Lizarazo has appeared in various novelas since 2010, notably the Telemundo network's Perro Amor, ¿Dónde Está Elisa?, Alguien te mira, and La Casa de al Lado; and the Venevision-Univision co-production, El Talismán.  She is frequently a co-host, presenter, and comic actress on variety shows and talk shows, including Nitido, El Gordo y la Flaca, and Este Noche Tu Night con Felipe Viel.

In addition to modeling, Lizarazo studied at the University of Miami Journalism – Media studies (Radio and TV), including acting Meisner technique under actor-teacher Sebastián Ligarde.  She also studied under Academy Award-nominated actress Adriana Barraza.

In March 2014, Lizarazo began appearing as a Miami correspondent on the Spanish TV sports program El Chiringuito de Jugones.

Jeinny Lizarazo has been Reporting Real Madrid News for ESPN Deportes 1210 since 2014, numerous occasions. is currently host of the TV show called El Pelotazo and She is social media personality in the world of football

Filmography

Film

Television

References

External links
 
 Jeinny Lizarazo at Twitter
  at Instagram
 

21st-century Venezuelan actresses
Venezuelan emigrants to the United States
Venezuelan female models
Venezuelan film actresses
Venezuelan telenovela actresses
Venezuelan television actresses
1988 births
Living people
People from Caracas